Aulis Koponen (5 April 1906 – 8 March 1978) was a Finnish international footballer who earned 39 caps at international level between 1924 and 1935, scoring 16 goals. Koponen played club football with HPS.

References

1906 births
1978 deaths
Footballers from Helsinki
Finnish footballers
Finland international footballers

Association footballers not categorized by position
20th-century Finnish people